The Creative Counsel is a South African advertising agency founded in 2001 by school friends Gil Oved and Ran Neu-Ner.

The company grew to become one of South Africa's largest advertising agencies (by staff and turnover), one of South Africa's largest private first-time employers, and South Africa's top marketing, media and advertising company.

In 2015 the company was acquired by the Publicis Group in a  deal estimated to be worth over R1.5-billion. The sale was reported as the largest business transaction in Africa and the largest agency buyout in South African history.

References

Marketing companies established in 2001
Companies based in Johannesburg
Advertising agencies of South Africa